Ben Haden (October 18, 1925 – October 24, 2013) was an ordained minister in the Presbyterian Church in America. He became internationally known through the religious broadcast: Changed Lives. Originating from the services of the First Presbyterian Church in Chattanooga, Tennessee, Haden's pulpit approach was described as arguing a case before a jury. With his background in the CIA and as CEO of a daily newspaper, Haden was also spoke on the Radio Bible Study Hour, succeeding Donald Grey Barnhouse of Tenth Presbyterian Church in Philadelphia. Haden was an atheist until he became Christian in 1954.

Haden was born in Fincastle, Virginia, in 1925.  He received his law degree from Washington and Lee College in 1949 and became a member of the Virginia bar. He also studied at the University of Texas at Austin and Columbia Theological Seminary in Decatur, Georgia. Haden pastored Key Biscayne Presbyterian Church in Miami, Florida before moving to become the 11th pastor of the First Presbyterian Church in Chattanooga, Tennessee in 1968. Haden followed James L. Fowle. Haden served the church in Chattanooga for 31 years before resigning in 1998 to pursue Changed Lives.org, an internet streaming video and audio on-demand ministry. The Changed Lives ministry produces "conversations", that last's from five to fifteen minutes and are carried out in a conversational tone. He emphasizes that these productions are not sermons, but simple conversations. This supports one of the aims of Changed Lives, which is to reach the many Americans who claim to be Christians, yet do not have a home church.

In 1963, while attending Columbia Theological Seminary, Haden published a non-fiction account of the people he met during his travels as a newspaperman in the Soviet Union, I See Their Faces. He died in Chattanooga on October 24, 2013.

Books by Haden
 I See Their Faces (1963). Royal Publishers: Johnson City, Tennessee. LCCN: 63025534 
 Rebel to Rebel (1971). LOGOI: Miami.
 Pray! Don't Settle for a Two-bit Prayer Life (1974). T. Nelson: Nashville. LCCN: 74005056

References

American Presbyterians
Presbyterian Church in America ministers
American television evangelists
1925 births
2013 deaths
Washington and Lee University alumni
University of Texas at Austin alumni